Baba Khvarazm-e Karim (also Romanized as Bābā Khvārazm-e Karīm; also known as Bābā Khvārazm and Bābā Khvārazm-e Soflá) is a village in Jayedar Rural District, in the Central District of Pol-e Dokhtar County, Lorestan Province, Iran. At the 2006 census, its population was 193, in 41 families.

References 

Towns and villages in Pol-e Dokhtar County